WorkflowGen is a web-based low-code business application creation solution developed by Advantys. As a workflow software and business process management (BPM) solution, WorkflowGen enables organizations to automate human and system-based processes via a visual interface in a low programming environment.

History 
Advantys, a software vendor founded in Paris in 1995 and specialized in creating advanced enterprise technological solutions, released WorkflowGen in France in 2003. Advantys was part of the Workflow Management Coalition (WfMC) when it introduced the XML Process Definition Language (XPDL) a format that enables the interchange of process definitions between workflow systems.  
 
 
 WorkflowGen was among the first workflow software to use the XPDL standard. In 2004,  WorkflowGen was listed by Gartner USA in its Smart Enterprise Suite Magic Quadrant along with vendors like Microsoft, SAP, and Oracle.   
Today, WorkflowGen is used worldwide by 500 mid-size and large corporations (1 million users in 70 countries) who use the workflow software to automate their business processes.

Features 
Workflow portal: WorkflowGen is provided with a ready-to-use workflow portal. The workflow portal is a 100% web based .NET application. The smart portal provides a summary of current user activity for all processes (ongoing, to do, late, closed, etc.). Process participants can quickly browse multiple forms with the quick view feature and approve dozens of requests in seconds with the quick mass approval feature. The request follow-up forms enables a comprehensive audit trail with real-time monitoring and a graphical view of the workflows. Users can create rich customized reports and dashboards by using their process data.

Built-in web form designer: Enables process designers to visually create web forms including advanced features like grid view with calculations, attachment management and data binding (SQL, web service, XML). The interactive workflow view lets process designers visually define the behavior of the form based on each workflow action.

Workflow designer: Workflows are designed graphically in HTML5 or Flash without programming including process data management (text, numeric, date, time, file), action management (human, automatic, sub-process), notification management (customizable event-based notifications), application management (eForms, import/export, web services, alerts, etc.) and roles associated with users and/or groups and/or directories.

Mobile App: WorkflowGen Mobile lets users access their workflow portals and perform their process actions remotely via their iOS and Android devices. This React Native app uses GraphQL. 

GraphQL API: With GraphQL, developers have control over data they want to manipulate and exchange with the WorkflowGen API, whether for a mobile app, a web application or micro services. The GraphQL API is a Node.js application. It runs as an IIS application thanks to iisnode and is fully integrated into the WorkflowGen architecture (load balancing, database scaling, SSO, etc.). It is possible for the developer to “extend” the GraphQL schema with their own fields, types and mutations.

OpenID Connect and SCIM v2: WorkflowGen supports the modern OpenID Connect authentication standard to simplify the integration with identity providers such as Azure AD, Windows ADFS, Auth0 and Okta. The SIM 2 API allows automatic user provisioning with Azure AD.

Applications 
WorkflowGen enables the implementation of complex business processes involving multiple integration points with existing systems (e.g. Single sign-on (SSO) authentication, ERP, HR applications, portals).  Users can create specialized user interfaces by using a combination of WorkflowGen GraphQL APIs and existing development frameworks

See also 
 Business process automation
 Business process management
 XPDL
 Workflow Management Coalition
 .NET Framework
 GraphQL
 Node.js
 OpenID Connect
 SCIM 2

References 

Workflow applications